Red Triangle, also known as Red Triangle Productions or Super-Hi, is a British songwriting and production team comprising Rick Parkhouse and George Tizzard. They are known for their work with popular acts including Westlife, David Guetta, James Arthur, Charlie Puth, The Struts, 5 Seconds of Summer, Cheryl, Little Mix, Ruth Lorenzo, The Vamps, The Saturdays, Union J, Fleur East, Laura White Loveable Rogues, Louis Tomlinson and are credited with over 80 major label cuts including Green Day.

Red Triangle worked with James Arthur on his album Back from the Edge, co-writing and producing four tracks including the single Can I Be Him. The album reached number one on the UK album charts and as was certified Gold in December 2016.

Red Triangle co-wrote the song "Good Girls" for Australian pop rock band 5 Seconds of Summer. The song ranked as number eight on the Billboard Digital Songs chart. "Good Girls" was released as the fourth single from the album.

In December 2015, Red Triangle produced the album Ghost Town by Spanish boyband Auryn. Red Triangle also have writing credits on the album. In its first week of release, the album topped Spanish album charts. Ghost Town has since been certified Gold.

Red Triangle are managed by Karma Artists Management  and published by Warner/Chappell Music UK.

Super-Hi 

In October 2020, Red Triangle released the single "Following the Sun" under their Super-Hi band name, a song which featured Tizzard's sister Katy on vocals as part of the duo Neeka. By 28 March 2022, "Following The Sun" by Super-Hi X Neeka had climbed to number 21 in the Australian ARIA Top 50 Singles chart.

Singles as Super-Hi

Writers discography

* Released as a single

References

English record producers
Music companies of the United Kingdom
British record production teams
British songwriting teams
Record production duos